Anniken Wollik (born 5 December 1997) is a Norwegian handball player for Romerike Ravens and the Norwegian national team.

Achievements
European Championship:
Winner: 2022

References

1997 births
Living people
People from Nannestad
Norwegian female handball players